TGR Foundation was established in 1996 by Tiger Woods and his father, Earl Woods, to create and support community-based programs that improve the health, education, and welfare of all children in America.  Currently, the foundation has established several programs and events such as the TGR Learning Labs, Hero World Challenge, Genesis Open, The National, and Tiger Jam which all benefit and impact the lives of millions of children.

The Tiger Woods Foundation is about empowering minorities, especially underprivileged minority students. The TGRF’s goal is for these students to be given the support and resources needed to be successful in school and beyond. In over the 20 years that this foundation has been opened they have served more than 175,000 students, as well as employing 1,000 educators each year. The foundation has been so successful due to its goal of “developing self-advocacy skills in young people,” that their students have a 98.7% college graduation rate, which is one of the highest graduation rates of a scholarship program in the country.

One of the greatest things about this foundation is that Tiger Woods created this program because he saw a hole in the society that he wanted to fill. He created this foundation because "I wanted a permanent, safe space for kids to explore their dreams" -Tiger Woods. He founded this program to help impoverished children and young adults, and in the past 22 years of it being opened, he has exceeded all expectations of this foundation.

External links
Official site

Educational organizations based in the United States
Tiger Woods
Golf associations
1996 establishments in California